The Mount Rainier Historic District is a national historic district located at Mount Rainier, Prince George's County, Maryland, which began as a streetcar suburb located northeast of Washington, D.C.  The district was built on a gently rolling rural landscape from about 1900 to 1940. The district contains more than 1,000 buildings, which are modestly scaled, detached, single-family, frame houses sited closely together with common setbacks. It consists primarily of single-family homes, with some small apartment buildings, a few duplexes, and single family homes that include a small storefront, usually located at the corner of an intersection. With the exception of five churches and a bank building known to have been designed by local architects, the remainder of the district's buildings are vernacular in character.  Some homes contain Queen Anne detailing.

It was listed on the National Register of Historic Places in 1990.

References

External links
, including photo in 1989, at Maryland Historical Trust website
Boundary Map of the Mount Rainier Historic District, Prince George's County, at Maryland Historical Trust

Historic districts in Prince George's County, Maryland
Queen Anne architecture in Maryland
Houses on the National Register of Historic Places in Maryland
Houses in Prince George's County, Maryland
Historic districts on the National Register of Historic Places in Maryland
National Register of Historic Places in Prince George's County, Maryland